Segundo Castillo Varela (17 July 1913 in Callao, Peru – 1 October 1993 in Callao, Peru) was a Peruvian footballer who played in Peru, Chile, Argentina and Colombia and for the Peru national football team. He was part of Peru's team at the 1936 Summer Olympics.

International
In addition to having played for Peru, he made an appearance for Chile in 1941.

Titles
 Sport Boys 1935 and 1937 (Peruvian Championship)
 Deportivo Municipal 1943 (Peruvian Championship)
 Universitario 1949 (Peruvian Championship)

References

External links
 
 
 
 
 

1913 births
1993 deaths
Sportspeople from Callao
Association football midfielders
Peruvian footballers
Peruvian expatriate footballers
Peru international footballers
Naturalized citizens of Chile
Chilean footballers
Chilean expatriate footballers
Chile international footballers
Olympic footballers of Peru
Footballers at the 1936 Summer Olympics
Peruvian Primera División players
Argentine Primera División players
Chilean Primera División players
Categoría Primera A players
Sport Boys footballers
Club Atlético Lanús footballers
Magallanes footballers
Deportes Magallanes footballers
Deportivo Municipal footballers
Club Universitario de Deportes footballers
Independiente Medellín footballers
Expatriate footballers in Argentina
Peruvian expatriate sportspeople in Argentina
Expatriate footballers in Chile
Peruvian expatriate sportspeople in Chile
Expatriate footballers in Colombia
Peruvian expatriate sportspeople in Colombia
Chilean expatriate sportspeople in Colombia
Copa América-winning players
Chilean people of Peruvian descent
Dual internationalists (football)